
Gmina Sadowne is a rural gmina (administrative district) in Węgrów County, Masovian Voivodeship, in east-central Poland.

Villages
Gmina Sadowne contains the villages and settlements of Bojewo, Grabiny, Kocielnik, Kołodziąż, Kołodziąż-Rybie, Kolonia Złotki, Krupińskie, Morzyczyn Włościański, Morzyczyn-Włóki, Ocięte, Orzełek, Płatkownica, Rażny, Sadoleś, Sadowne, Sójkówek, Sokółka, Szynkarzyzna, Wilczogęby, Zalesie, Zarzetka, Zieleniec and Złotki.

Neighbouring gminas
Gmina Sadowne is bordered by the gminas of Brańszczyk, Brok, Korytnica, Kosów Lacki, Łochów, Małkinia Górna and Stoczek.

References

 Polish official population figures 2006

Sadowne
Węgrów County